CHWY may refer to:
CHWY-FM, a radio station in Weyburn, Saskatchewan, Canada
NYSE stock symbol for Chewy (company), a pet food retailer